The Singapore national rugby sevens team is a minor national sevens side. They have competed in the Hong Kong Sevens many times, and were the host team in the former Singapore Sevens.

In 2015, the team won the SEA Games' bronze medal.

Summaries

References

Rugby union in Singapore
Singapore national rugby union team
National rugby sevens teams